Nieuwolda is a village in the Dutch province of Groningen. It is located in the municipality of Oldambt, about 9 km southeast of Delfzijl.

Nieuwolda was a separate municipality until 1990, when it was merged with Scheemda.

History 
The village was first mentioned in 1711 as Midde en Nieuwolda, and means "new woods". Nieuw (new) was added to distinguish between Midwolda. Nieuwolda is a road village which developed as a satellite of Midwolda after the Dollart dike was constructed in 1545.

The Dutch Reformed church was built in 1718 and a tower was added in 1765. The weather vane is a mermaid as a reference to the reclaimed land from the Dollart. The pumping station De Hoogte was constructed in 1892 and was powered by a steam engine. In 1920, it was converted to an electric engine. It became obsolete in 1976. It has been restored and in use as a museum. 

Nieuwolda was home to 1,315 people in 1840. It was a separate municipality until 1990, when it was merged with Scheemda. In 2010, it became part of Oldambt.

Gallery

References

External links
 

Former municipalities of Groningen (province)
Oldambt (municipality)
Populated places in Groningen (province)